Dan Dăscălescu is a Romanian-American entrepreneur based in Silicon Valley, who co-founded the ship-based seed accelerator project Blueseed in an attempt to allow entrepreneurs to start companies near Silicon Valley without US visa restrictions. He was also a software engineer at Google and Yahoo! and an ambassador for The Seasteading Institute, a think tank researching ocean communities.

Biography
Dascalescu was born in Romania and immigrated into Silicon Valley in fall 2004, after facing visa issues. He applied for a green card in 2007 and received it in April 2013. Dascalescu cited his visa difficulties as an inspiration for Blueseed, a startup accelerator that would avoid immigration restrictions by being located on a ship in international waters.

Before Blueseed, Dascalescu worked at Yahoo! as a software globalization developer and open-source contributor, and became an ambassador for the Seasteading Institute and founded the Quantified Self Forum, an online community for users passionate about self-tracking.

While in Romania, he translated books on TCP/IP networking and on building web applications. Dascalescu has a degree in Computer Science, with published papers on knowledge modeling and robotics.

Most recently, Dascalescu worked as a Developer Advocate for Google.

Blueseed

Blueseed was a startup community project that Dascalescu co-founded with Seasteading Institute colleagues Max Marty and Dario Mutabdzija, and served as CIO for. The project prepared to launch a ship near Silicon Valley to serve as a startup community and entrepreneurial incubator without United States work visa requirements. The platform was set to offer living and office space, high-speed Internet connectivity, and regular ferry service to the mainland.  The existence of the project is due to the lack of U.S. visas for entrepreneurs. Instead, customers will use the much easier to obtain B-1/B-2 visas to travel to the mainland, while work will be done exclusively on the ship.

On July 31, 2013, Dascalescu became COO of Blueseed, after CEO Max Marty announced he was stepping back from day-to-day operations.

Personal
Dascalescu's interests include transhumanism, life extension, physical fitness and self-quantification. He completed the P90X program and presented his findings at the 2011 Quantified Self conference, contrasting it with the Occam Protocol described by Tim Ferriss in Four Hour Body. He is an open-source contributor, advocates for English to be used as a global language and challenges religion.

References

Living people
21st-century American businesspeople
1980s births
Businesspeople from the San Francisco Bay Area
Yahoo! employees
Place of birth missing (living people)
Romanian emigrants to the United States
Chief information officers